The 1995 All-Ireland Senior Club Camogie Championship for the leading clubs in the women's team field sport of camogie was won by Rathnure (from Wexford, who defeated Toomevara from Tipperary in the final, played at Toomevara.

Arrangements
The championship was organised on the traditional provincial system used in Gaelic Games since the 1880s, with Leitrim Fontenoys and Davitts winning the championships of the other two provinces. Deirdre Hughes scored four goals for Toomevara to defeat Davitts of Galway in the semi-final, the fourth in extra time. Rathnure’s Ann Reddy scored 4–1 and Geraldine Codd 1–10 as they defeated Leitrim Fontenoys in their semi-final. Maureen McAleenan (0–7) and Nuala McGee (1–2) scored for Leitrim.

The Final
Marguerite Somers’ goal for Rathnure gave them a 1–5 to 0–3 half-time lead in the final and Bernie Higgins and Ann Reddy scored match-winning goals in the third quarter when. Toomevara’s attempt to save the match was saved by Rathnure goalkeeper Mary Fleming. A blow-torch was needed before the deeply frozen section of the pitch at Toomevara was declared playable.

Final stages

References

External links
 Camogie Association

1995 in camogie
1995